Conjugated fatty acids is jargon for polyunsaturated fatty acids containing at least one pair of conjugated double bonds. An example of a conjugated fatty acid is the rumenic acid, found in the meat and milk of ruminants.  Most unsaturated fatty acids that are doubly unsaturated do not feature conjugation, e.g., linoleic acid and linoelaidic acid.

Some conjugated fatty acids may confer health benefits ranging from the prevention of hypertension to protection against certain forms of cancer, although more research is needed to confirm such effects. Clinical studies and animal models have shown that conjugated fatty acids confer physiological benefits such as the regulation of the synthesis and breakdown of lipids, reduction of inflammation, and antioxidant properties.

Conjugated fatty acids include isomers of linoleic acid. Conjugated analogues linoleic acids are the most investigated conjugated fatty acids. The reason why the isomer of conjugated fatty acids are studied is because they have the potential to treat human illnesses. A biological activity that conjugated fatty acids have been studied for is the reduction of body fat and the increasing of lean body mass. There are experimental models that proved the ability of conjugated linoleic acid to reduce fat levels. This is why the scientific community see the potential to use conjugated fatty acids with active treatments to prevent obesity. However, research studies made in humans are in disagreement even though these studies have proven that the supplementation of conjugated linoleic acid has some benefits such as weight loss. On top of the research on conjugated linoleic acid on body weight regulation, isomers of conjugated linoleic acid have been shown in vitro to inhibit the growth and division of a cell to two daughter cells, initiate cell death, and interfere with mutagenicity in human tumor cells.

Conjugated fatty acids can have either a cis or trans configuration. For instance, the rumenic acid (cis-9, trans-11) is a conjugated trans fatty acid.

Studies have suggested that conjugated linoleic acids, an isomer of conjugated fatty acids, can modulate inflammatory responses in the body. However, CLA’s anti-inflammatory properties correlate to isomer dependence. For instance, (cis-9, trans-11) CLA has been shown to have a decreased inflammatory effect on adipose tissues of mice with obesity-causing genes, while (trans-10, cis-12) CLA reduces obesity in mice without affecting insulin resistance or adipose tissue inflammation.

See also
Polyunsaturated fatty acids

References

Fatty acids